Farsiyeh (also Romanized as Fārsīyeh; also known as Fārsīyeh-ye Yek) is a village in Shoaybiyeh-ye Gharbi Rural District, Shadravan District, Shushtar County, Khuzestan Province, Iran. At the 2006 census, its population was 416, in 64 families.

References 

Populated places in Shushtar County